is a public junior college in Aizuwakamatsu, Fukushima, Japan associated with the University of Aizu. It was established in 1951 as

See also 
 List of junior colleges in Japan

External links
  

Japanese junior colleges
Universities and colleges in Fukushima Prefecture
Educational institutions established in 1951
Aizuwakamatsu
1951 establishments in Japan